Culver School District is a public school district that serves the city of Culver, Oregon, United States, and the surrounding area of Jefferson County.

The district consists of three schools on a single  campus in Culver: Culver Elementary School, Culver Middle School, and Culver High School.

Demographics
In the 2009 school year, the district had 11 students classified as homeless by the Department of Education, or 1.6% of students in the district.

References

External links
 

School districts in Oregon
Education in Jefferson County, Oregon